Zyzzybalubah is the second studio album by the rock band Vas Deferens Organization. It was released in 1997 through Aether Records.

Track listing

Personnel 
Adapted from the Zyzzybalubah liner notes.
Vas Deferens Organization
Matt Castille – instruments, production, engineering
Doug Ferguson – instruments
Eric Lumbleau – instruments, production, cover art
Production and additional personnel
Jim Edgerton – guitar, sitar and keyboards on "Marigold Jello"
Doug Ferguson – bass guitar on "Futura Perspective" and "A Drowsy Orange"
Jay Jernigan – keyboards on "Effortless Pilgrimage Against Ashes", "It Was Just Moments Prior to Descent" and "Futura Perspective"
Sage Tilleman – vocals on "Marigold Jello"
Michelle Tilleman – vocals on "A Drowsy Orange"

Release history

References 

1997 albums
Vas Deferens Organization albums